Ivan Gaskell is a Derby born sports reporter for the BBC. He was sports editor and presenter at BBC Radio Stoke between 1986 and 1992, he joined BBC Sport in 1997, after working on East Midlands Today for 10 years. He worked on World Cup coverage in 2002 and 2006, and is a regular reporter on Football Focus, Match of the Day and Final Score. Along with these duties, Gaskell also occasionally presents sports bulletins on the BBC News Channel

Gaskell is an alumnus of Noel-Baker Community School.

References

British sports broadcasters
British association football commentators
British reporters and correspondents
BBC people
Living people
Year of birth missing (living people)